Scrapper is a 2011 American documentary feature film directed by Stephan Wassmann and co-directed by Olivier Hermitant. It documents the lives of persons who salvage scrap metal from a live-fire military testing range in Southern California.

Scrapper won Best Documentary at the Seattle True Independent Film Festival and the Spirit Award at the Brooklyn Film Festival in June 2011.  This feature documentary had its world premiere at the 2011 Slamdance Film Festival. It was also an official nominee at the Durango Film Festival and won a Royal Reel Award at the Canada International Film Festival
Scrapper is an official nominee at the 2011 San Francisco DocFest and the 25th Annual Leeds Film Festival (Nov. 2011) in the UK.

Personnel
 Director — Stephan Wassmann
 Co-director — Olivier Hermitant
 Producer — Stephan Wassmann
 Co-producers — Olivier Hermitant and Michael DiGregorio
 Writers — Stephan Wassmann and Michael DiGregorio
 Editor — Stephan Wassmann
 Cinematographer — Stephan Wassmann
 Additional writing — Olivier Hermitant
 Sound Mix — George Lockwood

References

Further reading

External links

2011 films
American documentary films
2011 documentary films
Films shot in California
2010s American films